Volley Treviso is a professional volleyball team based in Treviso. They were known at the past with the sponsorship name Sisley. The team plays at the Serie B.

Achievements
 Italian Volleyball League (9): 1994, 1996, 1998, 1999, 2001, 2003, 2004, 2005, 2007 
 Coppa Italia (4): 1993, 2000, 2004, 2005, 2007
 Italian Super Cup (7):1998, 2000, 2001, 2003, 2004, 2005, 2007
 CEV Champions League (4): 1995, 1999, 2000, 2006
 CEV Cup (2): 1994, 2011
 CEV Challenge Cup (4): 1991, 1993, 1998, 2003
 European Super Cup (2): 1994, 1999

2017-2018 Team
REF:

Famous players
 Andrea Anastasi
 Lorenzo Bernardi
 Dante Boninfante
 Luca Cantagalli
 Alberto Cisolla
 Giorgio De Togni 
 Alessandro Farina
 Alessandro Fei
 Andrea Gardini 
 Leondino Giombini 
 Pasquale Gravina
 Jiří Kovář
  Michał Łasko
 Pier Paolo Lucchetta
 Gabriele Maruotti
 Gian Paolo Montali
 Samuele Papi
 Gilberto Passani
 Damiano Pippi
 Giulio Sabbi
 Luca Tencati
 Paolo Tofoli
 Valerio Vermiglio
 Fabio Vullo
 Andrea Zorzi
 Marcos Milinkovic
 Gustavo
 Marcelinho
 Marcelo Negrão
 Ricardo Garcia (Ricardinho)
 Dimo Tonev
 Abdalsalam Abdallah
 Bertrand Carletti
 Pierre Pujol
 Stefan Hübner
 Peter Blangé
 Rob Bontje
 Robert Horstink
 Jan Posthuma
 Bas van de Goor
 Ron Zwerver
  Oleg Antonov
 Stanislav Dineykin
 Novica Bjelica
 Nikola Grbić
 Emanuel Kohút
 Kim Ho-Chul
 Bengt Gustafson
   Dmitrij Fomin

Famous coaches
 Daniele Bagnoli
 Nerio Zanetti
  Raúl Lozano
 Paulo Sevciuc
 Renan
 Anders Kristiansson

References

Italian volleyball clubs
Volleyball clubs established in 1987
1987 establishments in Italy
Benetton Group